Han Seung-yeon (born July 24, 1988), better known mononymously as Seungyeon, is a South Korean singer and actress. She is best known as the main vocalist of the South Korean girl group Kara and for her role in Hello, My Twenties!.

Early life and career beginnings 
Han Seung-yeon was born on July 24, 1988, in Yeongdeungpo District, Seoul, South Korea. She made her acting debut as a child actress in a bit part in Dear Ends (1993), Summer Showers (1995) and Star in My Heart (1997). She later left South Korea to study at Tenafly High School in New Jersey, United States. However, she withdrew from high school mid-course in order to pursue a singing career. After returning to South Korea, she debuted as a member of girl group Kara on March 29, 2007. During her time with the group, she passed a high school qualification exam, the College Scholastic Ability Test, and was accepted by Kyung Hee University, majoring in theater and film.

Career

2007–08: Debut and solo activities 
Seungyeon debuted as main vocalist of Kara on M! Countdown on March 29, 2007.

She was the VJ for MSL Break from 2007 to 2008. She replaced Tiffany of Girls' Generation as co-host of Boys and Girls Music Countdown in June 2008 with Kim Hye-sung, and later with actor Kim Soo-hyun. Their segment ended on May 8, 2009. From October to December 2008, she was part of the cast of the MBC Every 1 reality show I Need a Family – Season 2, where a group of celebrities would live life as a family, consisting of a father, mother, son and daughter. She also became part of MBC's entertainment news show Section TV as a "pop correspondent," debuting on November 21, 2008.

2009–present: Continued solo activities, Kara disbandment and label changes
Han was featured on rapper Nassun's single "Come to Play", which was released in March 2009, and was featured on the soundtrack for the movie Why Did You Come to My House? (2009), releasing her first solo song entitled "Miracle". In October 2009, she became part of the "Dream Team Girl Group" named 4Tomorrow for Samsung's campaign Samsung Anycall. Their digital single "Tomorrow" was released on October 6, and the official music video for their single was released on the October 12, starring actor Lee Dong-gun.

In 2010, she recorded the song "Super Star" for the soundtrack of the KBS2 drama Mary Stayed Out All Night. The same year, she became a host of MBC Every1's I Love Pet alongside fellow member Kang Ji-young. In 2011, she recorded the song "Because of Love" for the soundtrack of the SBS drama Warrior Baek Dong-soo. In July 2011, she became a co-host of SBS's Animal Farm.

Han released her first solo single "Guilty" on November 30, 2012, along with its music video. She had performance of the single on MBC's Music Core on December 15.

In 2013, Han appeared as the protagonist's younger counterpart in the daily drama Pure Love (2013). Then in her first major supporting role, Han portrayed Choi Suk-bin in the period drama Jang Ok-jung, Living by Love (2013). In 2014, starred in the weekend drama Jang Bo-ri is Here!. The same year, she played her first leading role in the cable series Her Lovely Heels. Also from 2013 to 2014, Han and fellow member Park Gyu-ri served as hosts of the music program The Show.

In January 2016, Kara was disbanded after Seungyeon, Park Gyuri and Goo Hara decided not to renew their contract. She later signed a contract with J Wide Company in the same year. In May, Han was cast in the omnibus web film Bugs Attack. In July 2016, Han starred in the coming-of-age youth drama Hello, My Twenties!.  
In October 2016, Han was cast in a short film titled Frame in Love.

In 2017, Han starred in JTBC's web drama Last Minute Romance. She also reprised her role in the sequel of Hello, My Twenties.

In 2018, Han switched over to Inyeon Entertainment and was cast in the fantasy romance drama About Time. She then took on the leading role in travel romance drama Twelve Nights.

In April 2020, Han signed with new agency YGX Entertainment.

In 2021, Han appeared in comedy horror film Show Me the Ghost as Ye-ji. She won Fantastic Actor Jury's Special Mention Award for her performance at 25th Bucheon International Fantastic Film Festival.

Discography

EPs

Singles

As lead artist

As featured artist

Guest appearances

Filmography

Film

Television series

Hosting

Audiobook 
 Victor the fool by Joachim de Posada, voice of Laura

Awards

References

External links 

  
 
 
 
 

1988 births
DSP Media artists
Kara (South Korean group) members
Living people
People from Seoul
Japanese-language singers
South Korean female idols
South Korean dance musicians
South Korean rhythm and blues singers
South Korean sopranos
South Korean women pop singers
South Korean child actresses
South Korean film actresses
South Korean television actresses
South Korean television presenters
South Korean women television presenters
South Korean radio presenters
Kyung Hee University alumni
21st-century South Korean actresses
21st-century South Korean women singers
Singers from Seoul
Tenafly High School alumni
South Korean women radio presenters
YG Entertainment artists